Brevoxathres x-littera is a species of longhorn beetles of the subfamily Lamiinae. It was described by Melzer in 1932, and is known from eastern Brazil and Bolivia.

References

Beetles described in 1932
Acanthocinini